Joel Dennerley (born 25 June 1987, Auburn, New South Wales, Australia) is an Australian water polo player. At the 2012 Summer Olympics, he competed for the Australia men's national water polo team in the men's event. He is 6 ft 4.5 inches tall.

Dennerley was picked in the water polo Sharks squad to compete in the men's water polo tournament at the 2020 Summer Olympics. Coached by Elvis Fatović, the team finished joint fourth on points in their pool but their inferior goal average meant they finished fifth overall and out of medal contention. They were able to upset Croatia in a group stage match 11–8. Australia at the 2020 Summer Olympics details the results in depth.

See also
 Australia men's Olympic water polo team records and statistics
 List of men's Olympic water polo tournament goalkeepers

References

External links
 

1987 births
Living people
People from New South Wales
Australian male water polo players
Water polo goalkeepers
Olympic water polo players of Australia
Water polo players at the 2012 Summer Olympics
Water polo players at the 2016 Summer Olympics
USC Trojans men's water polo players
Water polo players at the 2020 Summer Olympics